Javion Hamlet (born April 28, 1998) is an American professional basketball player who plays for the Newcastle Eagles of the British Basketball League. He played college basketball for the Motlow State CC Bucks, the Northwest Florida State Raiders, and the North Texas Mean Green.

Early life and high school career
Hamlet grew up in Memphis, Tennessee and began playing basketball at the age of five. He attended Whitehaven High School. He was lightly recruited in high school, with his only offer coming from Division II LeMoyne-Owen College. His father wanted him to attend LeMoyne-Owen and he was close to signing before he received an offer from Motlow State Community College.

College career
Hamlet began his college career at Motlow State Community College. He averaged 15.6 points and 8.4 assists per game and was named the MVP of the Tennessee Junior and Community College Athletic Association. He transferred to Buffalo after the end of the season. He left Buffalo only a few weeks after arriving and eventually transferred to Northwest Florida State College. He averaged 17.8 points and 6.6 assists per game for the Raiders as the team went to the NJCAA tournament elite eight. Following the end of the season Hamlet committed to continue his college career at North Texas over offers from SMU, Arkansas, Gonzaga, Temple, St. John's and Loyola (Illinois).

Hamlet became an immediate starter for the Mean Green. He was named first team All-Conference USA and the Conference USA Men's Basketball Player of the Year at the end of his junior season, leading the conference in assists and scoring in league play. He averaged 14.6 points and 4.7 assists per game. He led the Mean Green to two consecutive Conference USA Championships, he also led them to their first NCAA Tournament victory in program history.

Professional career
On August 26, 2021, Hamlet signed his first professional contract with Bnei Herzliya of the Israeli Basketball Premier League. He did not play a game for the team.

ALM Évreux (2021)
On November 24, 2021, Hamlet signed with ALM Évreux Basket of the LNB Pro B.

Texas Legends (2022)
On January 5, 2022, Hamlet signed with the Texas Legends of the NBA G League. He was then later waived on February 27, 2022.

Career statistics

College

NCAA Division I

|-
| style="text-align:left;"| 2019–20
| style="text-align:left;"| North Texas
| 31 || 31 || 30.4 || .492 || .419 || .873 || 3.0 || 4.7 || .7 || .0 || 14.6
|-
| style="text-align:left;"| 2020–21
| style="text-align:left;"| North Texas
| 28 || 28 || 33.0 || .436 || .377 || .883 || 3.8 || 4.5 || .5 || .0 || 15.7
|- class="sortbottom"
| style="text-align:center;" colspan="2"| Career
| 59 || 59 || 31.6 || .462 || .396 || .878 || 3.4 || 4.6 || .6 || .0 || 15.1

JUCO

|-
| style="text-align:left;"| 2016–17
| style="text-align:left;"| Motlow State CC
| 36 || 34 || 26.1 || .554 || .345 || .783 || 2.1 || 8.4 || 1.4 || .0 || 15.6
|-
| style="text-align:left;"| 2018–19
| style="text-align:left;"| Northwest Florida State
| 33 || 33 || 31.6 || .566 || .448 || .838 || 3.1 || 6.6 || 1.0 || .1 || 17.8
|- class="sortbottom"
| style="text-align:center;" colspan="2"| Career
| 69 || 67 || 28.8 || .560 || .397 || .811 || 2.6 || 7.5 || 1.2 || .1 || 16.7

Personal life
Hamlet's cousin, Jamie Ross, is a former assistant basketball coach.

References

External links
North Texas Mean Green bio
Northwest Florida State Raiders bio
Motlow State CC Bucks bio

Living people
1998 births
American men's basketball players
Basketball players from Memphis, Tennessee
Bnei Hertzeliya basketball players
North Texas Mean Green men's basketball players
Motlow State Bucks men's basketball players
Northwest Florida State Raiders men's basketball players
Point guards
Texas Legends players